Initially, Cowles Mead (Democratic-Republican) was declared the winner of the 4th seat. The votes from Camden, Liberty and Tatnal counties were not received in time and were originally not counted. When it was later decided to count them as valid, it resulted in Thomas Spalding (Democratic-Republican) overtaking Cowles Mead for the fourth and final seat by 39 votes. Spalding was then given the seat in place of Mead.

See also 
 United States House of Representatives elections, 1804 and 1805
 List of United States representatives from Georgia

References 

1804
Georgia
United States House of Representatives